Kartar Nath (born 1 March 1969) is an Indian former cricketer. He played nine first-class matches for Delhi between 1992 and 1997.

See also
 List of Delhi cricketers

References

External links
 

1969 births
Living people
Indian cricketers
Delhi cricketers
People from Jammu